Prince Edward Island Route 7 is a secondary highway in central Prince Edward Island. The short connecting route begins at an intersection with Route 2 west of Charlottetown, and runs north to Oyster Bed Bridge, where the road continues as Route 6. It is an uncontrolled, paved two-lane road for its entire length.

Major intersections

References 

Prince Edward Island provincial highways
Roads in Prince County, Prince Edward Island
Roads in Queens County, Prince Edward Island